Sky at Night is the fifth studio album by English rock band I Am Kloot. The album was produced by Guy Garvey and Craig Potter of the band Elbow and was released on 5 July 2010. Since 2 July 2010, the whole album has been streamed for free on the guardian.co.uk website.

On 20 July 2010, the album made the shortlist for the 2010 Mercury Music Prize. On 15 November 2010, it was announced that Sky at Night has received the German Record Critics' Award (Preis der deutschen Schallplattenkritik) in the "Pop and Rock" category.

Track listing 
The track listing for the album is as follows:

All songs written by John Bramwell. The line "we've got all the bullets, but there's no-one left to shoot" comes from "Oblivious" – a song by Aztec Camera.

The Japanese edition of Sky at Night includes additional track (#11) called "Black & Blue". The original version of this song appeared on You, Me and the Alarm Clock (1990) – a solo album by John Bramwell, then known as Johnny Dangerously.

Personnel 
source:

Instruments 
I Am Kloot:
 John Harold Arnold Bramwell
 Andy Hargreaves
 Peter Jobson
additional musicians:
 Prabjote Osahn – violin – tracks 1, 2 & 3
 Stella Page – viola – tracks 1, 2 & 3
 Margit van der Zwan – cello – tracks 1, 2 & 3
 Marie Leenhardt – harp – tracks 5 & 6
 Tony Gilfellon – guitar – track 2
 Bob Marsh – trumpet – tracks 2 & 10
 Peter McPhail – saxophone & flute – tracks 4, 9 & 10
 Colin McLeod – piano – track 10
 Norman McLeod – pedal steel guitar – track 10
others:
 Guy Garvey – string arrangements

Production and mixing 
 Guy Garvey & Craig Potter – production
 Craig Potter – mixing (at Blueprint Studios)
 Tim Young – mastering (at Metropolis Studios)
 Colin McLeod – additional production & engineering – track 10
 Seadna McPhail – additional engineering – tracks 1, 3, 4, 6, 8 & 10

Artwork 
 Gerald Jenkins – band photography
 Paul Brownless – design

Singles

Release history

References 

2010 albums
I Am Kloot albums